Jan Štěrba may refer to:

Jan Štěrba (born 1981), Czech sprint canoeist
Jan Štěrba (footballer, born 1994), Czech footballer